Michael Fagan may refer to:

 Michael Fagan (intruder) (born 1948), Buckingham Palace intruder
 Mike Fagan (born 1980), American bowler
 Michael Fagan, software designer who invented the Fagan inspection, a software inspection process